Nordhoff station is a station on the G Line of the Los Angeles Metro Busway system located in the Chatsworth neighborhood of Los Angeles in the western San Fernando Valley. The station opened in June 2012 and was built as part of the Metro Orange Line Chatsworth Extension.

Metro's Division 8 (West San Fernando Valley) bus depot is located directly west of the station. This is the assigned bus division where all Metro Orange Line  vehicles are parked and where maintenance is done. A direct bus only lane connection to the bus division was built as part of the Chatsworth Extension.

The Orange Line station is located at the intersection of Canoga Avenue and Nordhoff Street. The station's amenities include bicycle lockers and public art in the form of a 27-foot mosaic. A parking lot was not assigned for this station.

Service

Station Layout

Hours and frequency

Connections 
, the following connections are available:
 Los Angeles Metro Bus:

External links

References 

Los Angeles Metro Busway stations
Chatsworth, Los Angeles
G Line (Los Angeles Metro)
Public transportation in the San Fernando Valley
Bus stations in Los Angeles
2012 establishments in California